The Inukai Cabinet is the 29th Cabinet of Japan led by Inukai Tsuyoshi from December 13, 1931, to May 15, 1932.

Cabinet

References 

Cabinet of Japan
1931 establishments in Japan
Cabinets established in 1931
Cabinets disestablished in 1932